At Navy Pier 1, located within the larger Norfolk Naval Station in Virginia, at approximately 11:20 at night on 24 March 2014, Jeffery Tyrone Savage, a 35-year-old civilian truck driver, drove his 2002 Freight-liner near the pier and boarded the USS Mahan, a guided-missile destroyer. Savage was unarmed, but disarmed the sailor guarding the ship and used her weapon to shoot Petty Officer Mark Mayo, who intervened, fatally injuring him. Savage was later killed in a shootout with Navy security.

The incident was the subject of two investigations, one conducted by the Naval Criminal Investigative Service and the other by a one-star admiral to find out whether security procedures were followed at the base. 

Mayo was later awarded the Navy and Marine Corps Medal, the Navy and Marines’ highest non-combat decoration.

References 

2014 crimes in Virginia